17f or variation, may refer to:

 Highway 17F; see List of highways numbered 17F
 Tropical Depression 17F 
 Tropical Depression 17F (1999)
 Tropical Depression 17F (2000)
 Tropical Depression 17F (2005)
 Tropical Depression 17F (2017)
 Flottille 17F (17F flotilla), French Naval Aviation squadron
 Ian Fleming (codenamed "17F" in Naval Intelligence), British author and WWII spy

See also

 
 F17 (disambiguation)
 17 (disambiguation)
 F (disambiguation)